Harmony Hall may refer to:

NRHP-listed buildings in the United States
Harmony Hall (Hampden, Maine), a 1929 religious and civic building
Harmony Hall (Fort Washington, Maryland), part of the National Capital Parks-East system
Jacob Sloat House, formerly called Harmony Hall, late 1840s house, Sloatsburg, New York
Harmony Hall (Kinston, North Carolina), an 18th-century house
Harmony Hall (White Oak, North Carolina), an 18th-century house

Other uses
Harmony Hall (Scottish Borders) is a large house open to the public in Melrose in Scotland.
Harmony Hall (Columbia University), an undergraduate dormitory on the West Campus of Columbia University, New York City, New York, United States
Harmony Hall (Hampshire, UK), a short-lived, utopian socialist community founded by Robert Owen in 1839
"Harmony Hall" (song), a single by Vampire Weekend from the 2019 album Father of the Bride
Harmony Hall Fukui, a concert hall located in Fukui, Fukui, Japan
Harmony Hall Station, a railway station in the city of Fukui, Fukui, Japan
Harmony Halls, a barbershop quartet from the 1940s